Choir Boy is a coming-of-age play by American playwright Tarell Alvin McCraney. The play premiered in September 2012 at the Royal Court Theatre, London, before going on to play productions at New York City Center, Alliance Theatre, Geffen Playhouse, and many more regional theaters across the United States. The show opened on Broadway at the Samuel J. Friedman Theatre on January 8, 2019, after entering previews on December 12, 2018.

Main characters 
 Pharus Jonathan Young
 Headmaster Marrow
 Junior Davis
 David Heard 
 Bobby Marrow
 Anthony Justin ‘AJ’ James
 Mr. Pendleton

Production history

Royal Court Theatre, London 
Choir Boy opened at the Royal Court Theatre on September 4, 2012, and it played until October 6. Dominic Cooke directed and the cast featured: Dominic Smith (Pharus), David Burke (Mr Pendleton), Gary McDonald (Headmaster Marrow), Eric Kofi-Abrefa (Bobby), Kwayedza Kureya (Junior Davis), Khali Best (Anthony Justin), and Aron Julius (David Heard).

Manhattan Theater Club at City Center, Stage I 
Choir Boy was commissioned by Manhattan Theater Club. The production began previews on June 18, 2013, with an official opening on July 2, 2013. The production starred Jeremy Pope as Pharus Jonathan Young, Nicholas L. Ashe as Junior Davis, Kyle Beltran as David Heard, Grantham Coleman as Anthony Justin 'AJ' James, Chuck Cooper as Headmaster Marrow, Austin Pendleton as Mr. Pendleton, and Wallace Smith as Bobby Marrow. The show closed on August 11, 2013.

Alliance Theatre 
Choir Boy premiered on the Hertz Stage at Alliance Theatre on September 20, 2013, and closed on October 13, 2013. 

The show featured Jeremy Pope as Pharus Jonathan Young and Nicholas L. Ashe as Junior Davis, both reprising their performances from the City Center run of the show. New cast members included Caleb Eberhardt as David Heard, Joshua Boone as Bobby Marrow, Scott Robertson as Mr. Pendleton, John Stewart as Anthony Justin 'AJ' James, and Charles E. Wallace as Headmaster Marrow.  Serving as the production understudies were Victor Jackson for Pharus Jonathan Young and Junior Davis; Patrick McColery for Mr. Pendleton; Kevin O'Hara for Headmaster Marrow; and Alex B. West for Anthony Justin 'AJ' James, David Heard, and Bobby Marrow.

The production was directed by Trip Cullman, and featured set and costume design by David Zinn, lighting design by Peter Kaczorowski, sound design by Fitz Patton, music direction and vocal arrangements by Jason Michael Webb, and casting by Nancy Piccione, Kelly Gillespie, and Jody Feldman.

Geffen Playhouse 
The Geffen Playhouse production in Los Angeles, California began previews on September 16, 2014, before the official opening night on September 26, 2014, and a final performance on October 26, 2014. This production marked the show's West Coast premiere. 

The cast included Jeremy Pope as Pharus Jonathan Young, Nicholas L. Ashe as Junior Davis, and Grantham Coleman as Anthony Justin 'AJ' James, all reprising their performances from New York City Center Stage I, and Caleb Eberhardt as David Heard, reprising his performance from the Alliance Theatre production. New to the company was Michael A. Shepperd as Headmaster Marrow, Donovan Mitchell as Bobby Marrow, and Leonard Kelly-Young as Mr. Pendleton. 

The production was directed by Trip Cullman and featured set design by David Zinn, costume design by E.B. Brooks, lighting design by Peter Kaczorowski, sound design by Fitz Patton, music direction and vocal arrangements by Jason Michael Webb, and casting by Phyllis Schuringa.

Broadway 
Choir Boy began previews on Broadway at the Samuel J. Friedman Theatre on December 12, 2018, officially opening on January 8, 2019, and closing on March 10. Trip Cullman directed the production and Jeremy Pope reprised his role as Pharus Jonathan Young.

Toronto 
Choir Boy, co-produced by Canadian Stage and The Arts Club, opened on Friday November 11, 2022, at the Bluma Appel Theatre in the St. Lawrence Centre for the Arts.  Directed by Mike Payette, it starred Andrew Broderick, Kwaku Okyere, David Andrew Reid, Clarence "CJ" Jura, Savion Roach, Daren Herbert and Scott Bellis.

Casts

Awards and nominations

Original Off-Broadway production

Broadway production

References

External links
Internet Broadway Database

American plays
2012 plays